The Port Tower Complex is a vision skyscraper  tall, proposed to be located in Karachi, Sindh, Pakistan.

The complex will be located on 80 acres of land reclaimed from wetlands by the Karachi Port Trust, alongside the Mai Kolachi Bypass.

See also
 List of tallest buildings in Karachi
 List of tallest buildings in the world
 List of tallest buildings in Pakistan
 KPT Officers Society

References

External links 
 Emporis Buildings

Skyscrapers in Karachi
Proposed buildings and structures in Pakistan